4'-Methyl-α-pyrrolidinopropiophenone (4-MePPP, MPPP or MαPPP) is a stimulant drug and substituted cathinone. It is structurally very similar to α-PPP, with only one added methyl group in the para position on the phenyl ring. 4-MePPP was sold in Germany as a designer drug in the late 1990s and early 2000s, along with a number of other pyrrolidinophenone derivatives. Although it has never achieved the same international popularity as its better-known relations α-PPP and MDPV, 4-MePPP is still sometimes found as an ingredient of grey-market "bath salt" blends such as "NRG-3".

Legality 
In the United States 4-MePPP is considered a schedule 1 controlled substance as an positional isomer of alpha-pyrrolidinopentiophenone (α-PVP)

See also
 α-Pyrrolidinopropiophenone (α-PPP)
 4'-Methoxy-α-pyrrolidinopropiophenone (MOPPP)
 3,4-Methylenedioxy-α-pyrrolidinopropiophenone (MDPPP)
 3',4'-Methylenedioxy-α-pyrrolidinobutiophenone (MDPBP)

References

Designer drugs
Pyrrolidinophenones
Stimulants